FC Lyulin is a Bulgarian football club from Sofia, based in the capital's biggest residential area Lyulin, currently playing in the Sofia A OFG, the fourth division of Bulgarian football.

Current squad 

(captain)

External links 
 

Association football clubs established in 1985
1985 establishments in Bulgaria
Football clubs in Sofia